= Dace Raid =

Informal name of World War Two Allied raid

- Part of the Pacific War of World War II
Date	22 March 1944
Location	Hollandia, Dutch New Guinea

Belligerents
United States	Empire of Japan

Commanders and leaders
Captain "Blue" Harris †	Unknown

Strength
12	Unknown

Casualties and losses
6 killed	Unknown

The Dace Raid is an informal name given to a raid conducted by Allied troops in the Pacific in World War Two.

== Mission ==
On 22 March 1944, a party of twelve (including six natives) were off the coast of Hollandia on the US submarine Dace. Their mission was to conduct reconnaissance of the area over fourteen days. Captain "Blue" Harris decided to lead a reconnaissance party of five (including two natives) ashore, but capsized in their rubber boat, losing much of their equipment. A prearranged signal to the submarine to abort the following party was misinterpreted and the remainder of the party was sent apart from one man who was too ill. The party of eleven were onshore with little equipment or food, and limited weaponry. Only five men survived.

== Awards ==
Captain Harris, who was killed by the Japanese was mentioned in dispatches.
